The 1958 Texas A&M Aggies football team represented Texas A&M University in the 1958 NCAA University Division football season as a member of the Southwest Conference (SWC). The Aggies were led by head coach Jim Myers in his first season and finished with a record of four wins and six losses (4–6 overall, 2–4 in the SWC).

Schedule

Roster
QB Charlie Milstead, Jr.

References

Texas AandM
Texas A&M Aggies football seasons
Texas AandM Aggies football